Black Hammer is an unincorporated community in Black Hammer Township, Houston County, Minnesota,  United States.

Notes

Unincorporated communities in Houston County, Minnesota
Unincorporated communities in Minnesota